Rocket Attack U.S.A., also known as Five Minutes to Zero, is a 1958 propaganda espionage/science fiction film produced, directed and edited by Barry Mahon who intended to exploit the launching of Sputnik.

Premise
American secret agents John and Tanya are sent to the USSR after British agents relay information on a Russian plot to bomb America. The duo discover that the Soviets intend launching an ICBM sneak attack against the United States on the night that they arrive. The Russians are using information gathered by Sputnik to plan the attack, and as the American spies' attempt to sabotage  one rocket fails, they are shot.

Back in the United States, as the missile closes in, a radio reporter stays on the air to assist those threatened in this emergency as American defense missiles prove too slow to defend the country. The reporter's wife knows this will be his death sentence. As Manhattan is hit and 3 million are killed, a general bemoans the lack of a functioning ICBM missile defense system. The efforts to strengthen the US defense system were unsuccessful owing to limited funding and effort. The US retaliation is expected to be minimal as the Russian defenses have been properly funded and maintained. The end title begs the audience not to let this be the end.

Cast

John McKay as John Manston
Monica Davis as Tanya/Tannah
Daniel Kern
Edward Czerniuk
Phillip St. George as General Walker
 Art Metrano as Truck Driver

Reception
The Albany Herald stated the movie is so melodramatic and with such hilariously bad dialogue that it has developed a cult following while The Meridian Record-Journal found that it was among the worst movies produced. In Apocalypse Then the movie was found to be full of cheapness and histrionics, and despite being a sincere attempt, the movie is padded and some of the special effects are literally cartoons. The Encyclopedia of Science Fiction found the movie of interest only as an example of US paranoia over Communism in the 1950s.

In popular culture
It featured on a 1986 episode of Canned Film Festival and a 1990 episode of Mystery Science Theater 3000 (the latter which included the first use of the "stinger").

Home media
It was included as part of the Sci Fi Invasion DVD set released by Mill Creek Entertainment and the Mystery Science Theater 3000 Volume XXVII set.

References

External links 
 
 Rotten Tomatoes
 Rocket Attack USA is also available on Internet Archive
 Said MST3K episode on ShoutFactoryTV

1960s science fiction films
1960s spy films
1960 films
American black-and-white films
American independent films
American spy films
Cold War spy films
Films about nuclear war and weapons
American propaganda films
1960s exploitation films
American exploitation films
1960s English-language films
1960s American films